A Joint Committee on Inaugural Ceremonies is a special joint committee of the United States Congress formed every four years to manage presidential inaugurations. Such committee has been formed every four years since the 1901 inauguration of William McKinley.

The members are sitting U.S. senators and representatives. Typically, the House members include the speaker of the House as well as the House majority and minority leaders. The Senate members are drawn from the leadership of the Senate Committee on Rules and Administration (previously known by other names). A senator acts as chair, and is therefore drawn from the majority party of the Senate. Membership in the committee gives its members the opportunity to control tickets to the inauguration ceremonies as well as other electoral-related ceremonies.

1901 committee

1905 committee

1909 committee

1913 committee

1917 committee

1921 committee

1925 committee

1929 committee

1933 committee

1937 committee

1941 committee

1945 committee

1949 committee

1953 committee

1957 committee

1961 committee

1965 committee

1969 committee

1973 committee

1977 committee

1981 committee

1985 committee

1989 committee

1993 committee

1997 committee

2001 committee

2005 committee

2009 committee

2013 committee

2017 committee

2021 committee

See also 
 Senate Rules Committee

References

External links 
 

1901 establishments in Washington, D.C.
Inaugural
United States presidential inaugurations
United States presidential succession